Fotta or Fota ("mountain road", previously ) is a Turkish Cypriot village in the Kyrenia District of Cyprus. Fotta is under the de facto control of Northern Cyprus. As of 2011, it had a population of 525.

References

Communities in Kyrenia District
Populated places in Girne District